Hermann Möchel (5 January 1925 – 17 February 2007) was a German cross-country skier. He competed in the men's 30 kilometre event at the 1956 Winter Olympics.

References

External links
 

1925 births
2007 deaths
German male cross-country skiers
Olympic cross-country skiers of the United Team of Germany
Cross-country skiers at the 1956 Winter Olympics
People from Rochlitz
Sportspeople from Saxony